The Cheerleading Worlds, or Cheerleading World Championships, colloquially known as Worlds, is an annual international championship event for competitive cheerleading held in the United States. It is hosted by the U.S. All Star Federation in partnership with the International All Star Federation, the global organization of professionals and athletes involved in a club or All Star Cheer. Teams from around the world compete each year to receive a Bid to worlds.  The competition is held in Orlando, Florida at the ESPN Wide World of Sports in April or May and is a three-day event consisting of preliminary competitions, semi finals and finals. The first Cheerleading Worlds took place in 2004, and have recurred annually with the exception of the 2020 World Championships, which were canceled due to the COVID-19 pandemic.

Level 5, 6 and 7 cheerleading teams are invited to the competition by obtaining a bid from one of multiple regional and national competitions. Two types of bids are offered as a prerequisite in order to be eligible to compete. A "paid bid", where all competition expenses are covered, is worth up to $25,000. These expenses include lodging, passes to the Disney Parks, and registration fees to compete at the event. Full paid bids are awarded to only the highest scoring teams at the largest and most prestigious competitions throughout the season leading up The Cheerleading Worlds.

An "at-large bid" may also be awarded to teams that do not receive a paid bid, which does not cover any expenses to compete. There are more than 120 events that sponsor teams to compete at worlds, and without receiving a bid to attend, a team is ineligible to compete at this end-of-season event.  Around 9,000 athletes from over 40 countries compete every year.

Each routine is judged upon both difficulty and execution of jumps, standing tumbling, running tumbling, pyramid, basket tosses, dance, performance, and overall routine composition. Creativity is also included as a vital aspect of the scoresheet. Performances, otherwise known as routines, last around two minutes and thirty seconds. Obtaining a score with no deductions, otherwise known as "hitting zero", is crucial, because only the top teams from each round will advance to the next. All winning athletes in each of the 22 Cheerleading World Divisions are awarded a championship ring.

Results 
The sheet below shows each division and the winners.

References

Cheerleading competitions